Horace Bookwalter Drury (August 21, 1888 - November 8, 1968) was an American economist, lecturer at Ohio State University, and management author, particularly known for his early work on scientific management.

Biography 
Drury was born in Dayton, Ohio, in 1888, to Augustus Waldo Drury (1851-1935), a notable theologian and professor, and Sophia (Bookwalter) Drury. He obtained is AB in economics at Otterbein College, and his PhD from Columbia University in 1915 under Henry Rogers Seager.

After his graduation Drury became instructor of economics and sociology at Ohio State University. He came into prominence in the late 1910s after the publication of his PhD dissertation, Scientific Management: A History and Criticism in 1915, translated into German as Wissenschaftliche Betriebsführung : Eine geschichtliche und kritische Würdigung des Taylor-Systems. In 1918 he was lecturer in Industrial Organization at the University of California.

Since 1920, Drury was employed at the Division of Industrial Relations of the United States Shipping Board in Washington, D.C. After the US Shipping Board was abolished in 1934, Drury joined the Brookings Institution, where he was on the staff of the Research and Planning division. In 1934 to 1935 Drury was on the staff of the Division of Review of the National Recovery Administration (NRA) under Leon C. Marshall.

Work

Scientific Management: A History and Criticism 
Drury, in 1915, wrote The History of Management Thought as his PhD dissertation at Columbia under supervision of Henry Rogers Seager, and guided by Robert Thurston Kent, by then editor of Industrial Engineering journal. The dissertation was a survey and analysis of scientific management from a historical and economical point of view.

When Drury published his PhD thesis in 1915 the term "scientific management" had just come into being a few years earlier. The term didn't originate from Frederick Winslow Taylor or one of his associates. In 1911 Taylor had presented his work, system and associated to the general public in a series of four article in The American Magazine. under the title "The Gospel of Efficiency". Drury (1915) explained:
 

And furthermore:

The series of Interstate Commerce Commission hearings mentioned attracted national and international press, and with in between 1910 and 1915 the term "scientific management" had come into prominence in the United States. Drury (1915) confirms:

October 1910 meeting to determine the name 
In these 1910 hearings for the Interstate Commerce Commission the foreman of the attorneys of the railroads, Louis D. Brandeis, planned to explain the new management system of Frederick Winslow Taylor and associates to the commission and the general public. Taylor and associated would act as witnesses, and Brandeis wanted to get there story straight. Drury (1915) explained:

About that meeting:

the United States might save $1,000,000 a day 
The testimonies at the 1910 hearings for the Interstate Commerce Commission had some amazing results. As Drury (1915) explained:

And furthermore:

This argument about the power of scientific management argument was "felt almost instantaneously by the whole country."

Study of industrial prices 
In the 1930s, Drury conducted economic research with Edwin Griswold Nourse of the Institute of Economics and others. This resulted in the publication of two books America's Capacity to Produce in 1934, and Industrial Price Policies and Economic Progress in 1938. 
Vernon Arthur Mund (1960) mentioned about this work, that:

Drury and Nourse (1938) had explained, that:

Reception 
A 1924 article in The Personnel Journal acknowledge the early accomplishments of Drury's The History of Management Thought. The article explained: 

In his The History of Management Thought, Claude S. George (1972) gave a critical review of Drury's Scientific Management; a History and Criticism, and compared this work with Robert F. Hoxie's Scientific Management and Labor, also published in 1915. George explained:

Recently, in 2016, Morgen Witzel also acknowledged, that Horace B. Drury thesis is among the seminal works on scientific management. He stated:

Selected publications 

 Under supervision of Henry Rogers Seager, and guided by Robert Thurston Kent, by then editor of Industrial Engineering journal. Advice from Eugene Francis Simonds (1885–1980) – from Australia, a PhD candidate in mathematics at Columbia – and Carl Eugene Parry, PhD (1883–1958), of Ohio State University. In the front section of Drury's dissertation, "To A.W.D. and S.B.D.," his parents, Augustus Waldo Drury (1851–1935) and Sophia Bookwalter (maiden; 1856–1922).
 
 
 
 

 
 
 
 
 
 
  
 
 

 
 
 
 

 

 

 

 
Access guides:

Bibliography

Notes

References 

 
 
 
 
 
 
 
 

  ; ; .

  ; ; .

  ; ; .
 
 
  ; .

  ; ; .
 

 

  Retrieved September 1, 2022. ; .
 
 
  ;  (hardback),  (paperback), ; .

1888 births
1968 deaths
Engineers from Ohio
Otterbein University alumni
Columbia University alumni
Ohio State University faculty
University of California faculty
People from Dayton, Ohio
20th-century American engineers